Andrei Viktorovich Redkous (13 June 1957 – 3 November 2021) was a Soviet professional footballer who played as a forward.

Honours
 Soviet Cup: 1986
 Soviet Cup: runner-up 1982

References

1957 births
2021 deaths
People from Kansk
Soviet footballers
Association football forwards
Soviet Top League players
FC Zenit Saint Petersburg players
FC Torpedo Moscow players
FC Yenisey Krasnoyarsk players
FC Znamya Truda Orekhovo-Zuyevo players
FC Torpedo Vladimir players
Sportspeople from Krasnoyarsk Krai